Fernando Antonio Abad (born December 17, 1985) is a Dominican professional baseball pitcher in the Colorado Rockies organization. He previously played in MLB for the Houston Astros, Washington Nationals, Oakland Athletics, Minnesota Twins,  Boston Red Sox, San Francisco Giants, and Baltimore Orioles.

Professional career

Houston Astros
Abad began his professional career in 2006, pitching for the Dominican Summer Astros. That year, he went 5–2 with a 1.32 ERA in 15 games (11 games started). He also struck out 64 batters in 61 innings.

He split 2007 between the Greeneville Astros (17 games, four starts) and Tri-City ValleyCats (two games), going a combined 6–4 with a 4.25 ERA, with 59 strikeouts in 53 innings. In 2008, he pitched for the Lexington Legends, going 2–7 with a 3.30 ERA in 45 relief appearances, striking out 94 batters in 76 innings.

Abad pitched for the Lancaster JetHawks (41 games) and Corpus Christi Hooks (three games, all starts) in 2009, going a combined 4–7 with a 4.00 ERA, striking out 92 batters in 96 innings of work.

In 3 seasons with the Astros, Abad went 1–11 with a 5.10 ERA in 88 games while striking out 65 in 84 innings

Washington Nationals
On November 22, 2012, he signed a minor league contract with the Washington Nationals. He was called up to the big leagues when Ryan Mattheus was placed on the disabled list and he posted a 3.35 ERA in 37.2 innings out of the bullpen. On November 20, 2013, he was designated for assignment.

Oakland Athletics

On November 25, 2013, the Nationals traded Abad to the Oakland Athletics for minor league outfielder John Wooten.

In his first season in Oakland, Abad pitched a career high 69 games with a career low 1.57 ERA in 57.1 innings. Abad regressed the following season, allowing 11 home runs in under 60 innings. The Athletics designated Abad for assignment after the 2015 season, and he later elected free agency.

Minnesota Twins
Abad signed a minor league deal with the Minnesota Twins in December 2015. He became an integral part of the Twins' bullpen in 2016. Despite a 1–4 record, Abad had a 2.65 ERA in 39 games for the last place Twins.

Boston Red Sox
On August 1, 2016, the Twins traded Abad to the Boston Red Sox for Pat Light. In 2017, Abad appeared in 48 games for the Red Sox, pitching to a 3.30 ERA with 37 strikeouts in 43.2 innings of work. On November 2, 2017, Abad elected free agency.

Philadelphia Phillies
On February 17, 2018, Abad agreed to a minor league contract with the Philadelphia Phillies that included an invitation to spring training. He was released on March 21.

New York Mets
He signed a minor league contract with the New York Mets on March 25.

On June 7, 2018, Abad was suspended 80 games after testing positive for Stanozolol, a performance-enhancing substance and was released by the Mets upon the announcement of the news.

Long Island Ducks
On August 3, 2018, Abad signed with the Long Island Ducks of the independent Atlantic League of Professional Baseball. He became a free agent following the 2018 season.

San Francisco Giants
On February 16, 2019, Abad signed a minor league deal with the San Francisco Giants. On August 15, the Giants selected Abad's contract. He posted an ERA of 4.15 in 21 games.

Second stint with Washington Nationals
On December 18, 2019, Abad returned to the Washington Nationals, signing a minor league deal.  He was released on July 17, 2020.

New York Yankees
On July 24, 2020, Abad signed with the New York Yankees organization. He became a free agent on November 2, 2020.

Baltimore Orioles
On December 16, 2020, Abad signed a minor league contract with the Baltimore Orioles organization.
After the 2020 season, he played for Toros del Este of the Dominican Professional Baseball League(LIDOM). He has also played for Dominican Republic in the 2021 Caribbean Series. After posting a 4.26 ERA with 27 strikeouts in 26 appearances for the Triple-A Norfolk Tides, the Orioles selected Abad's contract on August 15, 2021.

Saraperos de Saltillo
On March 23, 2022, Abad signed with the Saraperos de Saltillo of the Mexican League.

Seattle Mariners
On May 4, 2022, Abad signed a minor league deal with the Seattle Mariners. He was assigned to the Triple-A Tacoma Rainiers, with whom he recorded a 3.56 ERA in 40 appearances, striking out 32 batters in 43.0 innings pitched. He elected free agency following the season on November 10.

Colorado Rockies
On January 9, 2023, Abad signed a minor league contract with the Colorado Rockies organization.

Pitching style
Abad features a four-seam fastball (94–97 mph), a sinker (92–95 mph), a curveball (78–83 mph), and a changeup (75–79 mph). He tends to use the sinker and changeup more against right-handed hitters, and his four-seamer and curveball more against left-handed hitters. He also occasionally throws an eephus pitch, around 55 mph.

References

External links

1985 births
Living people
Azucareros del Este players
Baltimore Orioles players
Baseball players suspended for drug offenses
Boston Red Sox players
Corpus Christi Hooks players
Dominican Republic expatriate baseball players in the United States
Dominican Republic sportspeople in doping cases
Dominican Summer League Astros players
Greeneville Astros players
Gulf Coast Astros players
Houston Astros players
Lancaster JetHawks players
Lexington Legends players
Long Island Ducks players
Minnesota Twins players
Oakland Athletics players
Oklahoma City RedHawks players
People from La Romana, Dominican Republic
Major League Baseball pitchers
Major League Baseball players from the Dominican Republic
Navegantes del Magallanes players
Norfolk Tides players
Richmond Flying Squirrels players
Round Rock Express players
Sacramento River Cats players
San Francisco Giants players
Syracuse Chiefs players
Tacoma Rainiers players
Toros del Este players
Tri-City ValleyCats players
Washington Nationals players
World Baseball Classic players of the Dominican Republic
2017 World Baseball Classic players
Dominican Republic expatriate baseball players in Venezuela